Live in San Marcos is a live album from Terri Hendrix, released in 2001.

Personnel
 Terri Hendrix: vocals, papoose, guitar, harmonica, mandolin
 Lloyd Maines: guitar, steel guitar, mandolin, papoose, dobro, vocals, jangle
 Paul Pearcy: percussion and drums
 Glenn Fukunaga: bass

Track listing
 "Intro"
 "Goodtime Van"
 "Fishing Blues"
 "Hole in My Pocket"
 "Walk on Me"
 "Get Up"
 "Don't Pet the Dog"
 "Fair"
 "Love Like This"
 "All Woman"
 "Old Joe Clark"
 "My Own Place"
 "Flowers"
 "Country John"   
 "New Orleans"   
 "Crossroads"

References 

Terri Hendrix albums
2001 live albums